Venus Williams was the defending champion, but did not compete this year.

Martina Hingis won the title by defeating Lindsay Davenport 6–4, 4–6, 7–5 in the final.

Seeds
The first four seeds received a bye into the second round.

Draw

Finals

Top half

Bottom half

External links
 Official results archive (ITF)
 Official results archive (WTA)

Zurich Open
Swisscom Challenge